Gold Township is one of twenty-five townships in Bureau County, Illinois, USA. As of the 2020 census, its population was 152 and it contained 88 housing units.

Geography

Cemeteries
The township contains Gold Township Cemetery.

Airports and landing strips
 Etheridge Airport

Landmarks
 Hennepin Canal Parkway State Park (southwest half)

Demographics
As of the 2020 census there were 152 people, 84 households, and 70 families residing in the township. The racial makeup of the township was 94.08% White, 0.00% African American, 0.66% Native American, 0.00% Asian, 0.66% Pacific Islander, 1.97% from other races, and 2.63% from two or more races. Hispanic or Latino of any race were 3.29% of the population.

There were 84 households, out of which 73.80% had children under the age of 18 living with them, 73.81% were married couples living together, 9.52% had a female householder with no spouse present, and 16.67% were non-families. 10.70% of all households were made up of individuals, and 0.00% had someone living alone who was 65 years of age or older. The average household size was 3.49 and the average family size was 3.80.

The township's age distribution consisted of 37.5% under the age of 18, 0.0% from 18 to 24, 28% from 25 to 44, 26.3% from 45 to 64, and 8.2% who were 65 years of age or older. The median age was 37.8 years. For every 100 females, there were 125.4 males. For every 100 females age 18 and over, there were 84.8 males.

The median income for a household in the township was $96,034, and the median income for a family was $95,172. Males had a median income of $32,371 versus $30,625 for females. The per capita income for the township was $28,007. None of the population was below the poverty line.

School districts
 Annawan Community Unit School District 226
 Bureau Valley Community Unit School District 340

Political districts
 Illinois's 14th congressional district
 State House District 74
 State Senate District 37

References
 
 US Census Bureau 2007 TIGER/Line Shapefiles
 United States National Atlas

External links
 City-Data.com
 Illinois State Archives

Townships in Bureau County, Illinois
Populated places established in 1849
Townships in Illinois
1849 establishments in Illinois